Philip Rieff (December 15, 1922 – July 1, 2006) was an American sociologist and cultural critic, who taught sociology at the University of Pennsylvania from 1961 until 1992, and also, during the 1950s, at the University of Chicago, where he met Susan Sontag. He was the author of a number of books on Sigmund Freud and his legacy, including Freud: The Mind of the Moralist (1959) and The Triumph of the Therapeutic: Uses of Faith after Freud (1966). He married his 17 year-old student Susan Sontag after 10 days of courtship in the 1950s. The marriage lasted eight years during which their son, David Rieff—a writer and editor of his mother's personal journals—was born. His second wife and widow Alison Douglas Knox died December 12, 2011.

Works
Freud: The Mind of the Moralist, 1959.
Collected Papers of Sigmund Freud (ed.). Collier Books, 1963.
The Triumph of the Therapeutic. Harper & Row, 1966.
Fellow Teachers. Harper & Row, 1973.
The Feeling Intellect.  University of Chicago Press, 1990.
My Life Among the Deathworks. University of Virginia Press, 2006.
Charisma. Pantheon, 2007.
 The Crisis of the Officer Class. University of Virginia Press, 2007.
 The Jew of Culture. University of Virginia Press, 2008.

Notes

Further reading

Aeschliman, M.D., “The Aesthetics of Moloch,” National Review, 17 July 2006, 41-2.
Imber, Jonathan B. (ed.). Therapeutic Culture: Triumph and Defeat. Transaction, 2004.
Manning, Philip. Freud and American Sociology. Polity Press, 2005.
Zondervan, A. A. W. Sociology and the Sacred. An Introduction to Philip Rieff's Theory of Culture. University of Toronto Press, 2005.

External links

Beer, Jeremy. Pieties of Silence, The American Conservative
Philip Rieff correspondence at the University of Pennsylvania Libraries

Rieff, Phillip
Rieff, Phillip
American male writers
American sociologists
Brandeis University faculty
Harvard University faculty
Jewish American writers
University of Chicago alumni
University of Pennsylvania faculty